The Billboard Music Award for Top Christian Album winners and nominees.

Winners and nominees

Superlatives
Four nominations
Casting Crowns
Chris Tomlin

Three nominations
MercyMe
TobyMac
Skillet

Two nominations
Lecrae

References

Billboard awards
Album awards